Jonas Krumrey (born 25 November 2003) is a German professional footballer who plays as a goalkeeper for 2. Liga club Liefering.

Career 
Krumray started with TSV 1860 Rosenheim and FC Bayern München. In 2017 he went on to the Red Bull Salzburg Academy, where he played at all three levels. Then he became 3rd goalkeeper of FC Liefering behind Daniel Antosch and Adam Stejskal. In June 2021 he signed a contract with FC Red Bull Salzburg lasting till 2025.

On  13 August 2021. he played his first match for FC Liefering versus SKU Amstetten where he was part of the Starting XI.

Career statistics

References

2003 births
Living people
German footballers
Association football goalkeepers
2. Liga (Austria) players
FC Liefering players